Notopeplum is a genus of sea snails, marine gastropod mollusks in the family Volutidae.

Species
Species within the genus Notopeplum include:

 Notopeplum annulatum Wilson, 1972
 Notopeplum cossignanii Poppe, 1999
 Notopeplum translucidum (Verco, 1896)

References

Volutidae
Taxa named by Harold John Finlay